Mount Bursik is the central peak,  high, of the Soholt Peaks, in the Heritage Range, Ellsworth Mountains. It was mapped by the United States Geological Survey from ground surveys and from U.S. Navy air photos, 1961–66, and named by the Advisory Committee on Antarctic Names for Captain Vlada D. Bursik, U.S. Navy, Deputy Commander, U.S. Navy Support Force, Antarctica, during Operation Deep Freeze 1966.

See also
 Mountains in Antarctica

References

 

Ellsworth Mountains
Mountains of Ellsworth Land